WomaNews was a radical feminist newspaper that began in Gainesville, Florida in the 1970s before moving production to New York, New York.

References
  Preview.
  Preview.

External links
WomaNews full text online archives in the University of Florida's Digital Library Center

1979 establishments in Florida
Culture of Gainesville, Florida
Defunct newspapers published in Florida
Feminism in Florida
Feminism in New York City
Newspapers established in 1979
Radical feminist literature
Women in Florida